Good Spirit is the fifth album and the third live album from Australian roots musician Xavier Rudd.  It was released in Australia on 11 April 2005.

The album was album recorded from various gigs around Australia: The Enmore Theatre in Sydney on 14 August 2004; The Palais, Melbourne on 19 August 2004 and at the Fly-by-Night Club in Fremantle on 21 August 2004.

Track listing

Charts

Certifications

References

External links
 Xavier Rudd home page
 Undercover review
 Xavier Rudd Article on Straight.com

Xavier Rudd albums
2005 live albums